Piansano is a  (municipality) in the Province of Viterbo in the Italian region of Latium, located about  northwest of Rome and about  northwest of Viterbo.

Piansano borders the following municipalities: Arlena di Castro, Capodimonte, Cellere, Tuscania, Valentano.

Demographic evolution

References

External links
 www.piansano.org/
 www.piansano.net/
 Amatori Piansano

Cities and towns in Lazio